Pearland High School (PHS) is an American public high school, located in Pearland, Texas, south of Houston. It is one of three high schools in the Pearland Independent School District, and serves parts of Pearland and most of the city of Brookside Village. U.S. News & World Report ranks it 242nd in Texas and 2,689th nationally. In 2015, the school was rated "Met Standard" by the Texas Education Agency.

Background and history

Prior to the school's establishment in 1937, Pearland students had to attend secondary school in Webster. The first graduating class in 1938 included valedictorian was Beatrice Woods who would become Beatrice Woods Theriot after marrying Melvin Theriot.

The original Pearland School, opened in 1937, had a staff of about 12 people and served 58 students in 1st through 12th grades on Grand Boulevard.

In 1953, the campus moved to Galveston Avenue, and the Grand Boulevard school became Pearland Elementary (later C.J. Harris Elementary). In 1991, the high school moved again, to Main Street (SH 35). The Galveston Avenue property is now home to the Pearland Historical Society, a Brazoria County Tax Office annex, Pearland Junior High School West Campus, and Leon H. Sablatura Middle School.

The school's mascot is the "Oiler Man" or "Oiler". In contrast to the local legend, the mascot was not inspired by the Houston Oilers professional football team (the school was established 25 years before the team). Instead it is a tribute to an important sector of the local and regional economy. Several local businesses in Pearland are related to the oil industry, including a helicopter service that ferries people to nearby off-shore oil wells in the Gulf of Mexico.

The current Pearland High School campus opened in 1991, on South Main Street. The original building (called the South Campus) has a capacity of 2,200 students. The building houses the auditorium, 2 gymnasiums (one was converted into a weight room), several vocational trades shops, and the athletic locker rooms.

In 1998, a 1,750 student capacity building was built adjacent to Pearland High School. This building houses three gymnasiums, a teaching theater, a broadcast studio, and a large cafeteria. This building was called the "North Campus" until being renamed for the late Sheryl Searcy, a longtime reading teacher at Pearland High School in 2009.

Glenda Dawson High School opened in 2007, relieving the overcrowded Pearland High School.

The school's marching band performed in the 2020 Rose Parade in Pasadena, CA on New Year's Day.

Athletics

The Pearland Oilers compete in these sports -

Baseball
Basketball
Cross Country
Football
Golf
Powerlifting
Soccer
Softball
Swimming and Diving
Water Polo
Tennis
Track and Field
Volleyball

Football
During the 2010 Football season, the Pearland High School football team had a perfect 16–0 record and upset the Euless Trinity Trojans in the Texas 5A State Football Championship. Notable athletes on the team include QB Trey Anderson, RB Dustin Garrison, DE Samuel Ukwuachu, and LB Kendall Ehrlich. The football team returned to the state championship game in 2013, but lost to the Kyler Murray led Allen Eagles in a blowout.

On October 3, 2014, its football team defeated the Dawson Eagles. This was the first year that Pearland and Dawson has ever played each other in a football game. Pearland would win again in 2015. In 2016 and 2017, Dawson would take the victory over Pearland. In the 2018 game held in the University of Houston’s TDECU Stadium, Pearland defeated Dawson. However, in 2019 and 2020, Dawson would take back the win. During the 2021-2022 season Pearland took their revenge and defeated Dawson.

Notable alumni
 

Ricky Churchman professional football safety and punt-return specialist with San Francisco 49ers
 Jarrod Cooper former professional football safety with Oakland Raiders and Carolina Panthers
 Anthony Dickerson former professional football linebacker with Dallas Cowboys and Buffalo Bills
 Kirk Dressendorfer former Major League Baseball pitcher
 Craig Hlavaty writer, Houston Chronicle; and guest host of KIAH television program NewsFix 
 Clay Hensley Major League Baseball pitcher

 Robbie Weinhardt Major League Baseball pitcher
 The Judy's punk and new wave band from 1970s and '80s
 Stephen Hollingshead Senior Adviser to United States Secretary of Housing and Urban Development
 Lauren Lanning beauty pageant titleholder; Miss Texas USA 2006; competed in Miss USA 2006 pageant
 Donald Miller Christian author
 Thomas Morstead professional football punter and kickoff specialist with the New York Jets
 Cyril Obiozor professional football linebacker with Denver Broncos
 Justin Phillips professional football linebacker with Oakland Raiders
 Fozzy Whittaker  professional football running back and kick returner with Carolina Panthers
 Megan Thee Stallion Professional rapper, artist and the Queen of Rap. 
 Cameron Reynolds  former NBA player with Minnesota Timberwolves, San Antonio Spurs, and Houston Rockets and current professional basketball player with Aquila Basket Trento
 Connor Wong  Major League Baseball player for the Boston Red Sox

See also

 List of high schools in Texas
 Houston

References

External links
 
 Pearland Schools Scores and Information
 pearlandband.org, Pearland High School Band
 pearlandoilers.com, Pearland High School football team
 pearlandbaseball.com, Pearland High School baseball team
 Pearland Academic Decathlon History

1937 establishments in Texas
Educational institutions established in 1937
Pearland Independent School District high schools
Schools in Pearland, Texas